Mitchell Clarke (born 26 November 1999) is an Australian professional basketball player for the Perry Lakes Hawks of the NBL1 West. After playing his first five seasons with the Hawks, he had a season as a development player with the Perth Wildcats of the National Basketball League (NBL) before playing for the Bendigo Braves in the NBL1 South in 2022.

Early life
Clarke attended Scotch College in Perth, Western Australia, where he competed in athletics, basketball and football.

Basketball career

Perry Lakes Hawks
In 2017, Clarke debuted in the State Basketball League (SBL) for the Perry Lakes Hawks. He averaged 2.89 points, 1.32 rebounds and 1.04 assists in 28 games in his first season. In 2018, he helped the Hawks win the SBL championship. He averaged 6.39 points, 2.18 rebounds and 2.42 assists in 33 games in his second season. In 2019, he averaged 8.29 points, 3.82 rebounds and 2.89 assists in 28 games.

In 2020, Clarke helped the Hawks reach the grand final of the West Coast Classic. In 15 games, he averaged 10.87 points, 4.4 rebounds and 4.13 assists per game.

In the inaugural NBL1 West season in 2021, Clarke helped the Hawks win the championship. In 25 games, he averaged 13.12 points, 4.48 rebounds and 4.16 assists per game.

Clarke returned to the Hawks for the 2023 NBL1 West season.

Perth Wildcats
In 2018, Clarke joined the Perth Wildcats Academy and pre-season training squad for the first time. He impressed at the NBL Blitz pre-season tournament in November 2021, playing in all five games and averaging 3.8 points and 1.2 assists per game. On 2 December 2021, Clarke signed with the Wildcats as a development player for the 2021–22 NBL season. He made his NBL debut three days later in the Wildcats' 90–67 win over the Cairns Taipans, playing the final two minutes of the game and recording one turnover. He played four games for the Wildcats during the season.

Bendigo Braves
In March 2022, Clarke signed with the Bendigo Braves for the 2022 NBL1 South season. In 21 games, he averaged 10.95 points, 4.24 rebounds, 3.52 assists and 1.57 steals per game.

References

External links

NBL profile
NBL1 profile
Perry Lakes Hawks profile
SBL stats

1999 births
Living people
Australian men's basketball players
Basketball players from Perth, Western Australia
People educated at Scotch College, Perth
Perth Wildcats players
Point guards